Zamir is both a given name and surname multiple origins in Jewish, Arabic, Albanian, and Russian culture.

 In Arabic, Zamir means "heart" or "conscience". This is properly transliterated as Ḍamīr but commonly appears as Zamir, Zameer, Damir, or Dameer.
 Among Albanians, Zamir is a male given name which means "good voice." Its feminine form is Zamira.
 In Russian, Zamir (Russian: Замир) means "for peace."

Jewish surname 
 Zvi Zamir (born 1925), soldier and espionage chief
 Yitzhak Zamir (born 1931), judge
 Hagai Zamir (born 1951), paralympic champion
 Daniel Zamir (born 1981), saxophonist
 Anat Zamir (1962–2018), actress and model
 Asaf Zamir (born 1980), Israeli politician

Muslim given name 
 Zamir Jafri (1916 – 1999), Pakistani poet
 Zamir Niazi  (1932 - 2004), Pakistani journalist
 Zamir Ali Badayuni (born 1941), Pakistani writer
 Zameer Sattaur (born 1963), Guyanese-American imam and teacher
 Zamir Kabulov (born 1954), Russian diplomat
 Zameer Rizvi (born 1981), Pakistani-Canadian singer and musician
 Muhd Zameer Zainun (born 1990), Malaysian footballer
 Zameer Ahmed Khan, Indian politician

See also 
 Zamir (disambiguation)

References

Hebrew-language surnames